The Great Grape Ape Show is an American animated television series produced by Hanna-Barbera Productions and broadcast on ABC from September 6 to December 13, 1975. ABC continued to air it in reruns until 1978.

Premise
The title character is The Great Grape Ape (voiced by Bob Holt), who is a 40-foot purple gorilla with the mind of a child. His catch phrase is saying his name twice ("Grape Ape, Grape Ape") after anything anyone says, usually as a form of agreement or acknowledgement of what was said. He travels the countryside with his canine pal Beegle Beagle (voiced by Marty Ingels), whom he calls "Beegly Beagly".

Grape Ape's immense size tends to initially shock and frighten those unfamiliar with him, and his presence alone has often terrified people and animals, causing them to run off screaming invariably: "YEOW! A gorill-ill-ill-ill-la!". The only exception to this was the character Rosie O'Lady (voiced by Janet Waldo), who appeared in Episode 11, "The Indian Grape Call". When asked by Beagle why she did not yell in fear like everyone else did upon seeing Grape Ape, she simply said, "You've seen one 40-foot purple ape, you've seen them all". In "Ali Beagle and the Forty Grapes", a wooden city limits sign reacted to Grape Ape's presence (after "overhearing" that no one else had) by progressively displaying the "YEOW!" phrase, with Beegle reading aloud as the sign changed, unfolding additional segments for the several "ill[a]" syllables (after which it folded itself up and hopped away in fear).

Grape Ape and his friend Beegle Beagle usually ride around in a small yellow van driven by Beegle Beagle with Grape Ape sitting on the roof which can somehow support his weight. A recurring bit of business would be for him to "rev up" the tiny vehicle like a child with a friction toy, then hop aboard as the van would start on its way. Also, Grape Ape's steps would often bounce Beegle into the air, where his legs would keep walking without breaking stride.

Given his size, Grape Ape's sneezes were equivalent to a hurricane and when he cried which was sometimes when he was homesick for his family, his tears could cause flooding in areas. When he does wrong, he also famously says, "I'm sorry!", which is done so often Beegle Beagle knows when it is coming and sometimes says it along with him, though often in a playful way.

Cast
 Bob Holt as The Great Grape Ape
 Marty Ingels as Beegle Beagle

Additional
 Joan Gerber
 Virginia Gregg
 Bob Hastings
 Allan Melvin
 Don Messick
 Alan Oppenheimer
 Hal Smith
 John Stephenson
 Lurene Tuttle
 Lennie Weinrib
 Frank Welker
 Paul Winchell

Broadcast history
The Great Grape Ape Show was broadcast in these following formats on ABC:
 Tom and Jerry/Grape Ape Show (September 6, 1975 – September 4, 1976, ABC Saturday 8:30-9:30 AM)
 Tom and Jerry/Grape Ape/Mumbly Show (September 11, 1976 – November 27, 1976, ABC Saturday 8:00-9:00 AM) (reruns of Tom and Jerry and Grape Ape)
 The Great Grape Ape Show (September 11, 1977 – September 3, 1978, ABC Sunday 11:00-11:30 AM) (reruns)

The show was originally broadcast as a segment of Tom and Jerry/Grape Ape Show during the 1975–76 season; for the 1976–77 season, the show became Tom and Jerry/Grape Ape/Mumbly Show, and in 1977–78, The Great Grape Ape Show became its own half-hour show on Sunday mornings. Thirty-two 10-minute installments of Grape Ape were made; two were aired per 30-minute episode.

Grape Ape also appeared as a member of "The Yogi Yahooeys" team on Scooby's All-Star Laff-A-Lympics / Scooby's All-Stars from 1977 to 1979 and would often team up with Yakky Doodle in sporting competitions. In Britain, the BBC ran The Great Grape Ape with the cartoon series Bailey's Comets during 1977–78. The Tom & Jerry Show also appeared elsewhere in the BBC schedules, whereas the other part of the U.S. Saturday fare, Mumbly was shown by ITV.

Like many animated series created by Hanna-Barbera in the 1970s, the show contained a laugh track created by the studio.

Episodes

* Telecast at Noon (EST), Thursday afternoon, November 27, 1975, as part of ABC's Thanksgiving Funshine Festival.

Home media
The episodes "That Was No Idol, That Was My Ape" and "The All-American Ape" are available on the DVD Saturday Morning Cartoons 1970's Vol. 2.

Media adaptations
Norbert Fersen adapted the TV show into a comic strip in the 1970s, under its French translated name Momo et Ursul.

Other appearances
 Grape Ape had his own short-lived comic book series called The Great Grape Ape that ran 2 issues in September and November 1976 published by Charlton Comics. He also appeared in Laff-A-Lympics #1 to #11 and #13 as well as Hanna-Barbera TV Stars #1. Both titles were published by Marvel Comics in 1978–79. He also appeared in Hanna-Barbera Presents #6 published by Archie Comics in 1996. Outside of these American comics, Grape Ape was featured in three annual comics published in England from 1978 through 1980.
 Grape Ape appeared in the Laff-A-Lympics segment as part of "The Yogi Yahooeys" team on Scooby's All-Star Laff-A-Lympics / Scooby's All-Stars (1977–79). His size varies on the show, sometimes being his normal 40 ft. and other times about 6–10 feet depending on the scene.
 Grape Ape made a cameo appearance in the Yogi's Space Race (1978) episode "Nebuloc–The Prehistoric Planet".
 In the Dexter's Laboratory episode "Chubby Cheese", Grape Ape (voiced by Jeff Bennett) was among the animatronic Hanna-Barbera characters in the animatronic show as he closes out Chubby's song.
 Grape Ape also made a cameo in an episode of The Grim Adventures of Billy & Mandy called "Giant Billy and Mandy All Out Attack".
 Grape Ape was featured in the episode "Grape Juiced" of Harvey Birdman, Attorney at Law with Grape Ape voiced by John Michael Higgins and Beegle Beagle voiced by Doug Preis.
 In Episode 539 of Saturday Night Live that was hosted by Queen Latifah, the TV Funhouse segment The X-Presidents featured Grape Ape (voiced by Jeff Bergman). In a Pro-War propaganda cartoon that Ronald Reagan shows to Gerald Ford, Jimmy Carter, and George H.W. Bush, Grape Ape was shown taking part in the Invasion of Grenada where he scares the big-toothed Grenada soldier into hiding in a log as a skunk (which was previously seen in a Bugs Bunny cartoon about the Korean War) says "P.U." When Gerald Ford asks "Who's Grape Ape", Ronald Reagan quotes "He had a show. We were saving The Smurfs for Nicaragua."
 In the Robot Chicken episode "I'm Trapped", Grape Ape is seen dead and a crowd of policemen are around his body where they realize that they did not hear the G in his name, which would explain why they shot him.
 Grape Ape made a cameo in the Mad segment "Demise of the Planet of the Apes", where he is one of the occupants of the Super Ape Motel.
 Grape Ape and Beegle Beagle make a cameo in a 2012 MetLife commercial entitled "Everyone".
 Grape Ape was mentioned on the October 1, 2014 episode of The Tonight Show Starring Jimmy Fallon, during his "Audience Suggestion Box" segment. Bystanders were asked in Times Square to name as many animals as possible in a few seconds, and one mustachioed man answered "grape." When asked why, he stated "I was thinking about Grape Ape."
 Grape Ape appeared in Brak Presents the Brak Show Starring Brak, voiced by Dave Willis.
 Grape Ape had a cameo on Cartoon Planet episode 10 "Tom Foolery".
 Grape Ape and Beegle Beagle appeared in DC Comics Nightwing/Magilla Gorilla Special #1.
 Grape Ape appears in the end credits of  Scoob!. He appears as a new recruit of the Falcon Force, a new team made by the Blue Falcon.
 Grape Ape appeared in Jellystone! voiced by C.H. Greenblatt. In "Gorilla in Our Midst", Grape Ape falls asleep in the middle of the town causing its citizens to find a way to wake him up.
 Grape Ape and Beegle Beagle appeared in the 2021 special Scooby-Doo, Where Are You Now!

In other languages

See also
 List of fictional primates

References

External links
 
 The Great Grape Ape at Don Markstein's Toonopedia. Archived from the original on August 29, 2016.
 The Great Grape Ape at Aaron's New Tom and Jerry Information Site

1975 American television series debuts
1978 American television series endings
1970s American animated television series
American children's animated comedy television series
American Broadcasting Company original programming
Animated television series about apes
English-language television shows
Television series by Hanna-Barbera
Television shows adapted into comics